Mozzanica is a comune (municipality) in the Province of Bergamo in the Italian region of Lombardy, located about  east of Milan and about  south of Bergamo.

Mozzanica borders the following municipalities: Caravaggio, Castel Gabbiano, Fara Olivana con Sola, Fornovo San Giovanni, Sergnano.

Mozzanica is the location of a Rohm and Haas plant.

References